This article lists the various interim and final United Nations estimates for the number of Palestinian people who fled or were expelled from their homes during the 1948 Palestine war. It also provides other interim and final estimates for the number of Palestinian refugees for that period.

UN estimates

Estimate of number of people who left or fled the area captured by Israel

 726,000 according to the Final Report of the United Nations Economic Survey Mission for the Middle East published by the United Nations Conciliation Commission, December 28, 1949.
 711,000 according to the General Progress Report and Supplementary Report of the United Nations Conciliation Commission for Palestine, Covering the Period from 11 December 1949 to 23 October 1950, published by the United Nations Conciliation Commission, October 23, 1950.

Estimates of total number of people who registered as refugees
 800,000 – 900,000 according to the Historical Survey of Efforts of the United Nations Conciliation Commission for Palestine to Secure the Implementation of Paragraph 11 of General Assembly Resolution 194 (III) published by the United Nations Conciliation Commission, October 2, 1961.
 875,998 refugees in June 1951, according to the Report of the Director of the United Nations Relief and Works Agency for Palestine Refugees in the Near East published by the United Nations Relief and Works Agency, September 28, 1951.
 914,000 refugees in 1950, according to the United Nations Relief and Works Agency website.
 957,000 refugees in 1950 according to the Report of the Director of the United Nations Relief and Works Agency for Palestine Refugees in the Near East published by the United Nations Relief and Works Agency, September 28, 1951.

Other estimates of flight or refugees

 550,000 − 600,000 According to an Israeli government estimate (according to Efraim Karsh)
 539,000 According to Walter Pinner 
 583,000 – 609,000 According to Efraim Karsh
 600,000 According to Joseph B. Schechtman
 630,000 According to Yoram Ettinger
 700,000± According to Benny Morris in his book "The Birth of the Palestinian Refugee Problem Revisited"
 720,000 According to Irving Howe and Carl Gershman
 750,000 According to Ilan Pappé
 800,000 According to Elia Zureik (750,000 – 800,000 "Private Palestinian sources", 800,000 – 900,000 "Palestinian figures" , 850,000 "United Nations estimate")
 800,000± According to Baha Abushaqra
 800,000 – Walter Eytan, in a private letter of 1950 referred to the UNRWA registration in 1949 as "meticulous", but thought that "the real number was close to 800,000".
 804,767 According to Salman Abu-Sitta
 900,000 According to Abdel-Azim Hammad
 935,000 According to Salman Abu-Sitta

Interim estimates
Interim estimates from UN sources:
 Sir Raphael Cilento, director of the UN Disaster Relief Project (DRP): 300,000 − 350,000 in August
 360,000 in September, 1948, according to the Progress Report of the United Nations Mediator on Palestine published by UN Mediator Count Folke Bernadotte, September 16, 1948.
 472,000 in October, 1948, according to the Progress Report of the Acting United Nations Mediator on Palestine published by Acting UN Mediator Ralph Bunche, October 18, 1948.

From other sources:
 200,000+ by May, 1948 according to Samuel Katz (in 1973)
 300,000± by May, 1948 according to Noam Chomsky (in 2002)
 380,000± by 15 May 1948 according to Ilan Pappe (in 1994)
 335,000 by 5 June 1948 according to Yossef Weitz  of the Jewish National Fund.
 391,000 by 1 June 1948 according to a report by the Haganah's intelligence service (239,000 from the UN-ascribed Jewish state.)
 200,000 by the mid-June 1948 according to Emil Ghoury.
 300,000± by late July according to W. De St. Aubin, delegate of the League of Red Cross Societies to the Middle East.
 631,967 by October "the Arab League estimate" according to Efraim Karsh.
 460,000 by late October, according to an Israeli study led by Y. Weitz and E. Danin & Z. Lifshitz.

See also
 1948 Palestinian exodus
 1948 Palestinian exodus topics
 Palestinian refugees topics

Footnotes

References

1940s in All-Palestine (Gaza)
1948 in Mandatory Palestine
1948 Palestinian exodus